Zolfaghar (named after Zulfiqar; also known as Peykaap III) is a class of fast patrol craft operated by the Navy of the Islamic Revolutionary Guard Corps of Iran.

Design 
Peykaap III is a modified version of North Korean IPS-16, manufactured by Iran.

Dimensions and machinery 
It uses one surface piercing propeller, powered by two diesel engines.

Armament 
It is also compatible with Chinese C-701/FL-10 torpedoes. Their secondary armament is two 12.7mm machine gun.

References

External links 
 Profile at globalsecurity.org
 Profile at cmano-db.com 

Fast patrol boat classes of the Navy of the Islamic Revolutionary Guard Corps
Missile boat classes
Ships built by Marine Industries Organization